The University of Texas at Austin High School (UTHS) is a public online high school affiliated to the University of Texas at Austin. Its offices are located in the Development Office Building on the University's campus in Austin, Texas, United States. It serves students around the world and provides individual courses and diploma programs to students online.

History
In 1998, the Texas State Board of Education authorized UTHS to provide a high school curriculum and award Texas high school diplomas. UTHS is a Texas public school, defined as a Special Purpose District (TEC §11.351).

Academics
UTHS offers more than 60 online courses, including English, social studies, mathematics, science, world languages, health, computer applications, physical education, economics, and electives. It also offers Advanced Placement (AP) courses in a number of subjects. Course credits are earned through examination. All of its courses are designed to meet the Texas Essential Knowledge and Skills (TEKS) requirements.

See also
 Indiana University High School
 Stanford University Online High School
 University of Missouri High School
 University of Nebraska High School

References

High schools in Austin, Texas
Public high schools in Texas
University-affiliated schools in the United States
University of Texas at Austin
Online schools in the United States